The San Diego Trolley is the light rail system that serves the metropolitan area of San Diego.  The operator of the Trolley, San Diego Trolley, Inc. (SDTI), is a subsidiary of the San Diego Metropolitan Transit System (MTS). The San Diego Trolley opened for service on July 26, 1981,  Today operates three main lines named the Blue Line, the Orange Line, and the Green Line, as well as a supplementary heritage streetcar downtown circulator known as the Silver Line that operates mid-days on Tuesdays & Thursdays, and on weekends and holidays.

History
The current operating company of the San Diego Trolley system, San Diego Trolley Incorporated (SDTI), was not founded until 1980 when the Metropolitan Transit Development Board (now operating as San Diego's MTS) began to plan a light-rail service along the Main Line of the former San Diego and Arizona Eastern Railway (SD&AE Railway), which the MTDB purchased from the Southern Pacific Railroad in 1979. The Trolley began operations on July 19, 1981, with revenue service beginning on July 26, 1981. Trains at that time operated on a single line between Centre City or Downtown San Diego and San Ysidro, with stops in some San Diego neighborhoods, and in the cities of National City and Chula Vista.

In March 1986, SDTI opened an extension east from Centre City San Diego to Euclid Avenue, along the La Mesa Branch of the former SD&AE Railway – this new second line of the Trolley was then called the East Line, while the original line opened in 1981 became the South Line. Service was extended along the East Line to Spring Street on May 12, 1989 serving Lemon Grove, and then to La Mesa and El Cajon on June 23, 1989. Service between El Cajon and Santee, which is not along the old SD&AE right-of-way, began on August 26, 1995.

The "Bayside" extension of the Trolley in San Diego, which operates near the waterfront, opened on June 30, 1990. The first phase of the extension to Old Town, from C Street to Little Italy in Downtown San Diego, opened on July 2, 1992. The second phase of the Old Town extension, running from Little Italy to Old Town, opened on June 16, 1996.

The "Mission Valley West" SDTI extension, which opened a new Trolley route between Old Town and Mission San Diego (which included the Qualcomm Stadium stop) commenced service on November 23, 1997, just before San Diego's hosting of Super Bowl XXXII in early 1998. It was at this time that the former South and East Trolley Lines were renamed the Blue Line and Orange Line, respectively. The "Mission Valley East" extension between Mission San Diego and La Mesa opened for service on July 10, 2005, coinciding with the inauguration of the Green Line.

Stations along the Blue and Orange lines were renovated during 2010–15 as part of the Trolley Renewal Project.

Current system

The San Diego Trolley system has 62 operational stations serving its four Trolley lines.

Fourteen of the Trolley system's stations operate as transfer stations, which allow passengers to transfer between lines.  There is one universal transfer point (i.e. allowing for transfers among all four lines) in the system in downtown San Diego: the 12th & Imperial Transit Center station.  The adjacent Santa Fe Depot/America Plaza/Courthouse stations, which are within walking distance of each other, also allow for transfer among the four lines.  Six Trolley stations are end-of-line stations. Of the 63 stations, 37 of them are within the city limits of San Diego, serving various neighborhoods in San Diego; the other 16 stations are located in surrounding communities, such as El Cajon and National City.

Most stations in the San Diego Trolley system are 'at-grade' stations.  There are ten aerial stations in the system and a single underground station (the SDSU Transit Center station).

About half of San Diego Trolley stations offer free park and ride lots. Most Trolley stations offer connections to MTS bus lines.

Renamed stations
In 1986, the station on C Street, between Fifth and Sixth Avenues, originally named Gaslamp North or Centre City station, was renamed Fifth Avenue station and has been known as such ever since.

The Qualcomm Stadium stop was simply renamed "Stadium" after Qualcomm's naming rights to the stadium expired in June 2017.

Closed station
The San Diego Square station, opened in 1981 on C Street between Seventh & Eighth Avenues downtown, was closed on March 23, 1986, due to low ridership, its close proximity to the (then renamed, see above) Fifth Avenue station, and the desire to eliminate a station in order to accommodate the soon-to-open infill station at E Street (which opened in October 1986) without adding to travel times along the line.

Remnants of this old station still remain on C Street between Seventh & Eighth Avenues.

Lines
, trolley service operates on three main lines offering daily service: the Blue, Green, and Orange Lines, and travels through the 62 stations and 65 total miles of mostly double-track rail. A fourth line, the heritage streetcar Silver Line, operates more limited weekday and weekend service, in a clockwise 'circle-loop' around downtown San Diego only.

Stations
The following table lists all stations currently served by the San Diego Trolley.

References

 
Stations
Trolley
Passenger rail transportation in California
San Diego Trolley
Light rail in California
Electric railways in California
Public transportation in San Diego County, California
Transportation in San Diego
Railway lines opened in 1981
Tram, urban railway and trolley companies
San Diego Trolley stations